Yury Nikolayevich Uliachenko (sometimes shown as Yury Ulyachenko, born January 25, 1973) is a Kyrgyzstani sprint canoer who has competed in the mid-1990s. At the 1996 Summer Olympics in Atlanta, he was eliminated in the repechages of both the K-2 500 m and the K-2 1000 m event.

References

External links
 
Sports-Reference.com profile

1973 births
Canoeists at the 1996 Summer Olympics
Kyrgyzstani male canoeists
Living people
Kyrgyzstani people of Ukrainian descent
Olympic canoeists of Kyrgyzstan